The Carver Industrial Historic District is a national historic district located at Carver, Richmond, Virginia. The district encompasses 13 contributing buildings located west of downtown Richmond.  The industrial area developed between 1890 and 1930, along the tracks of the Richmond, Fredericksburg and Potomac Railroad. The buildings are in a variety of popular 19th-century and early 20th century architectural styles including Queen Anne and Romanesque.

Notable buildings include the Peter Stumpf Brewing Company or the Home Brewery (1891), Baughman Stationery Company (1903), Consumers' Ice Company building (1906), American Tobacco Company warehouse (1906), Eagle Paper Company building (1912), Export Leaf Tobacco Company factory (1915), Haines, Jones and Cadbury Company (1926), Saunders Oil Company building (c. 1930), and the Virginia Railroad and Power Company substation (1915).

It was added to the National Register of Historic Places in 2000.

References

Historic districts on the National Register of Historic Places in Virginia
Industrial buildings and structures on the National Register of Historic Places in Virginia
Queen Anne architecture in Virginia
Romanesque Revival architecture in Virginia
Buildings and structures in Richmond, Virginia
National Register of Historic Places in Richmond, Virginia
Richmond, Fredericksburg and Potomac Railroad